Eduardo Antonio Winsett Gutierrez, Jr. (born March 20, 1968), professionally known as Tonton Gutierrez, is a Filipino film and television actor best known for his role as Governor Eduardo Buenavista in the original hit teleserye Pangako Sa 'Yo, it was topbilled by Kristine Hermosa, Jericho Rosales, Eula Valdez and Jean Garcia.

He was introduced in Viva Films' Sana'y Wala ng Wakas (1986) as Sharon Cuneta's leading man and became the film outfit's exclusive contract star. He starred in Viva Films movies -- Nakagapos na Puso (1986), Kung Aagawin mo ang lahat sa Akin (1987); Pasan ko ang Daigdig (1987), Alabok sa Ulap (1987) and Saan Nagtatago ang Pag-ibig? (1987) as Val, the retardate husband of Estela played by Vilma Santos. From the aforementioned movie, he received best actor trophies from Catholic Mass Media Awards (CMMA), PMPC's Star Awards and Film Academy of the Philippines (FAP) in 1987. In 1996, he was awarded best actor by the Gawad Urian for Reyna Films' Abot Kamay ang Pangarap.

Early life
Eduardo Antonio Gutierrez, Jr. is the son of Eddie Gutierrez and actress Liza Lorena. His parents did not marry and eventually separated after he was born. Ramon Christopher Gutierrez is his half-brother from his father's second relationship with actress Pilita Corrales. Ruffa Gutierrez, Rocky Gutierrez, Elvis Gutierrez, Richard and Raymond Gutierrez, and Ritchie Paul Gutierrez are his half siblings from his father's marriage to Annabelle Rama.

Personal life
Tonton Gutierrez is married to actress Glydel Mercado on March 15, 2004, at the Sanctuario de San Antonio Parish, Forbes Park, Makati. Together they have two daughters. He is of American descent on both his father and mother's side.

Filmography

Television

Movies

Captain Barbell (1986) - Al / Aswang
Sana'y Wala Nang Wakas (1986)
Alabok sa Ulap (1987) - Teddy Tuazon
Tatlong Nukha ng Pag-Ibig (1988)
Pasan Ko Ang Dagig (1987)
Jack N' Jill (1987) - Danny
Kung Aagawikin (1987)
Saan Nagtatago Ang Pag-Ibig? (1987)
Jack N' Jill sa Amerika (1988)
Abot Hanggang Sukdulan (1989)
Kahit Wala Ka Na (1989)
Tiny Terrestrial: The Three Professors (1990)
Sa Kabila Ng Lahat (1991)
Kaputol ng Isang Awit (1991)
Darna (1991)
Paniwalaan Mo (1993)
Ang Boyfriend Kong Gamol (1993)
Kapantay ay Langit (1994)
Syota ng bayan (1994)
Oo Na,Sige Na (1994)
Forever (1994)
Basa Sa Dagat (1995)
Dahas (1995)
Muntik ng Maabot ang Langit (1995)
Patayin sa Sindak si Barbara (1995)
SPO4 Santiago (1996)
Abot Kamay ang Pangarap (1996) - Gawad Urian Award winner for Best Actor
Saan Ako Nagkamali (1995)
Sariwang Bulaklak (1996)
Nananabik Sa Iyong Pagbabalik (1996)
Bubot, Kulang sa Panahon (1997)
Kriselda, Sabik Sa Iyo (1997)
Manananggal in Manila (1997) - Desidek
Shake Rattle and Roll 6 (1997) Manrey (segment "Ang Buwan")
Ambisyosa (1998)
Tuloy...Bukas Ang Pinto (1998)
May Sayad (1998)
Armadong Hudas (1998)
Tatlo...Magkahalo (1998)
My Guardian Debil (1998)
Shirley (1998)
Alyas Pogi: Ang Pagbabalik (1999) as Mayor Villegas
Baliktaran (2000)
Ooops, teka lang...Diskarte ko'to! (2001) as Johnny Estrella
Marital Rape (2001)
Hayop sa Sex Appeal (2001)
Di kita ma-reach (2001)
Sana Totoo Na (2002)
Cass & Carry: Who Wants to Be a Billionaire? (2002) as Mr. Roma
Ang Tanging Ina (2003) as Alfredo
Magnifico (2003) as Ka Romy
Forever My Love (2004) as Jimmy
I Will Survive (2004) as Manolo
So...Happy Together (2004) as Erwin
Let The Love Begin (2005)  as Jake
Say That You Love Me (2005)
Sa Harap ng Panganib (2007)
Shake Rattle and Roll 9 (2007) Chuck (segment "Christmas Tree")
Loving You (2008) as Virgilio 
When I Met U (2009) as Manny
Dalaw (2009) as Father of Rica & Cecil
Hating Kapatid (2010)
Ang Tanging Ina Mo (Last na 'To!) (2010)
Rosario (2010) as Party Guest
Way Back Home (2011) as Ariel Santiago
Born To Love You (2012) as Rex's dad
Bakit hindi ka crush ng crush mo? (2013) as Miguel Prieto
Boy Golden: Shoot to Kill, the Arturo Porcuna Story (2013) as Col. Rey Maristela
 Just The Way You Are (2015) as Theodore Sison
 Felix Manalo (2015) as Benjamin Santiago
" The Love Affair" (2015) as Greg
 Camp Sawi (2016) as Miguel

References

1968 births
Living people
Filipino male television actors
Filipino male child actors
Filipino television personalities
Filipino people of American descent
Filipino people of Canadian descent
Filipino people of Spanish descent
Tonton
Male actors from Manila
Filipino male film actors
ABS-CBN personalities
GMA Network personalities
TV5 (Philippine TV network) personalities